One Man Gang is the ninth solo studio album by Finnish rock singer Michael Monroe.

Singles
The first single, "One Man Gang", was released on 30 July 2019. On 5 September 2019, "Last Train to Tokyo" was released as the second single.

Track listing

Personnel
Musicians
 Michael Monroe – lead vocals
 Steve Conte – guitars
 Rich Jones – guitars
 Sami Yaffa – bass
 Karl Rockfist – drums

Production
 Michael Monroe – producer
 Rich Jones – producer, artwork
 Steve Conte – producer
 Petri Majuri – recording, mixing
 Bobby Nieminen – photography

References

2019 albums
Michael Monroe albums